Actenodia is a genus of blister beetles in the family Meloidae. The genus was named and described by Francis de Laporte de Castelnau in 1840.

Species
The genus was revised in 2008, and contains the following 18 species:

 Actenodia billbergi (Gyllenhal, 1817)
 Actenodia carpanetoi Bologna & Di Giulio, 2008
 Actenodia cerrutii Bologna, 1978
 Actenodia chrysomelina Erichson, 1843
 Actenodia confluens (Reiche, 1866)
 Actenodia curtula Fähraeus, 1870
 Actenodia denticulata (Marseul, 1872)
 Actenodia distincta (Chevrolat, 1840)
 Actenodia guttata Laporte de Castelnau, 1840
 Actenodia lata (Reiche, 1866)
 Actenodia luteofasciata Pic, 1929
 Actenodia mateui (Pardo Alcaide, 1963)
 Actenodia mirabilis Kaszab, 1952
 Actenodia perfuga (Dvorák, 1993)
 Actenodia peyroni (Reiche, 1866)
 Actenodia septempunctata (Baudi di Selve, 1878)
 Actenodia suturifera (Pic, 1896)
 Actenodia unimaculata Pic, 1908

References

Meloidae